Delias kuhni, Kuehn's jezebel, is a butterfly in the family Pieridae. It was described by Eduard Honrath in 1887. It is found in the Australasian realm.

Subspecies
D. k. kuhni (Banggai, Peleng) 
D. k. prinsi Martin, [1913] (Central Sulawesi)
D. k. sulana  Staudinger, 1895 (Mangole, Taliabu)
D. k. yoshimiae Yagishita, 1989 (Buru)

References

External links
Delias at Markku Savela's Lepidoptera and Some Other Life Forms

kuhni
Butterflies described in 1887